The strawberry hedgehog cactus or Engelmann's hedgehog cactus (Echinocereus engelmannii) is commonly found in desert areas of the southwestern United States and the adjacent areas of Mexico, including the states of California, Nevada, Utah, Arizona, Baja California and Sonora.

Description 
Engelmann's hedgehog cactus usually grows in clusters, sometimes up to 20 and more stems. The bright magenta flowers bloom in April in its southern extremes to late May at northern locations. The fruit is spiny. At first the fruit is green, becoming pink and drying when ripe. Ripe fruits have spines that are easily detached. Seeds are black and about a tenth of an inch in size.

Stems are initially cylindrical and erect in young plants, but later with the stem base lying on the ground. The plants have around 10 ribs, which are somewhat flattened and tuberculate.

Spines are variable in color and size.

Origin and Habitat: Engelmann's hedgehog cactus is one of the most common species of cactus in the south-western USA (southern California, Arizona, southern Nevada, Utah) and Mexico (Baja California down to northern Baja California Sur, Sonora). There are a number of varieties of Echinocereus engelmannii, and some are rare.
Altitude: From near sea level to 2400 meters.
Habitat: It grows in different dry habitats normally in well drained deserts in the Sonoran and Mojave deserts, chaparral, pinyon-juniper woodlands, grass, and Great Basin shrub in flats with fine sand on the plain, washes and canyons in the desert, and also in gravelly, sandy, or rocky hillsides, and in mountain ranges. The rich flora and diverse vegetation of the area includes, among others, Ferocactus cylindraceus, Mammillaria microcarpa, Mammillaria tetrancistra, Echinocereus scopulorum, Fouquieria sp., Larrea tridentata, Cercidium microphyllum, Idria columnaris, Opuntia leptocaulis, Opuntia ramosissima, and Opuntia engelmannii. Engelmann's hedgehog cactus is abundant throughout its range.

Uses
Echinocereus engelmannii is used as a landscape plant in its native areas. In pot culture, this species requires well aerated gritty substrate and a hot and sunny location in the summer. During winter, this species tolerates light frost and wet (if well-drained) soil. In cultivation, this species usually does not bloom until it develops 2-3 branches.

References

External links
Calflora Database: Echinocereus engelmannii (Calico Cactus, Engelmann's hedgehog cactus)
Jepson Manual Treatment — Echinocereus engelmannii
USDA Plants Profile: Echinocereus engelmannii (Strawberry Hedgehog Cactus)
Flora of North America
Echinocereus engelmannii — U.C. Photo gallery

engelmannii
Cacti of the United States
Cacti of Mexico
Flora of Arizona
Flora of Baja California
Flora of California
Flora of Nevada
Flora of Sonora
Flora of the California desert regions
Flora of the Sonoran Deserts
Natural history of the Colorado Desert
Natural history of the Mojave Desert
North American desert flora
Plants described in 1852